Jørgen Randers (born 22 May 1945) is a Norwegian academic, professor emeritus of climate strategy at the BI Norwegian Business School, and practitioner in the field of future studies. His professional field encompasses model-based futures studies, scenario analysis, system dynamics, sustainability, climate, energy and ecological economics.  He is also a full member of the Club of Rome, a company director, member of various not-for-profit boards, business consultant on global sustainability matters and author. His publications include the seminal work The Limits to Growth (co-author), and Reinventing Prosperity.

Early life and education 
Randers is the son of the Norwegian physicist Gunnar Randers and the nephew of Norwegian mountaineer Arne Randers Heen. He received a Masters of Science in Solid State Physics at the University of Oslo in 1968, and a PhD in Management at the MIT Sloan School of Management in 1973, having originally been accepted to complete a PhD in physics.  Whilst at MIT, he became one of the original four co-authors of The Limits to Growth, a "seminal text on the use of computer-modelling in simulating the consequences of economic and population growth in a finite world".

Academic career 
In 1973, he was appointed Assistant Professor of Management at the MIT Sloan School of Management.  In 1974, he left MIT to pursue a career in business.

From 1981 to 1989 he served as president of the BI Norwegian Business School, and he served as a professor from 1985 to 2015. Since 2015, he has been Professor Emeritus.

From 2001 to 2012, he was a core member of the faculty of the Cambridge Institute for Sustainability Leadership, Cambridge.

In 2013, he was appointed as Honorary Professor, Anglia Ruskin University, Cambridge.
In 2016, he was appointed as Honorary Professor, Fudan Institute for Advanced Study in Social Science, Shanghai.
In 2018, he was appointed as Honorary Researcher, School of Marxism, Peking University, Beijing.

In 2019, Randers was appointed as inaugural co-chair of the Ecological Civilization Center at Peking University's Research Institute of Xi Jinping Thought on Socialism with Chinese Characteristics for a New Era.

Randers' research interests are on climate issues, scenario planning and system dynamics, especially on the topics of sustainable development, climate change and global warming mitigation.

Business career 
In 1974, he left the MIT Sloan School of Management and founded the Resource Policy Group, a system dynamics based policy analysis institute based in Oslo, and served as director between 1974 and 1980.

In 1980, he was appointed to the Ministry of Long-Term Planning, in Oslo, involved with macroeconomic planning.  Subsequently, he was appointed as deputy director of Deminex (NORGE) AS, an oil production company.

Between 1989 and 1991, he served as managing director of World City AS, a financial holding company based in Oslo.

Between 1994 and 1999, he served as deputy director general of the World Wildlife Fund International in Switzerland.

Board appointments 
During his career, he has served as Chair of a number of companies including:
 yA Bank AS, an internet bank (2006 to 2014)
 8 eBok AS, an electronic publisher (1999 to 2003)
 21st Venture AS, a radio and IT holding company (1999 to 2016)
 P4 Radio Hele Norge AS, commercial radio company (1992 to 1996)
 David Livsforsikrings AS, a life insurer (1992 to 1994)
 Green Business AS, an environmental goods and services business (1989 - 1991)
 Norwegian Bank for Industry (1988 to 1992)
 Åke Larson Construction AS (1988 to 1993)
 Sven Sejersted Bødtker & Co. AS, ship-owners (1983 to 1993)
 Sunnmørsbanken Oslo AS, a commercial bank (1981 to 1985)

Between 1988 and 1993, he also served as Chair of the Norwegian Institute for Market Research.

In addition, he has served as a director of:
 Posten Norge ASA, the Norwegian Postal Service (2011 to 2015)
 [Kanal 24] Norge AS, a commercial radio company (2002 to 2003)
 Egroup ASA, an internet consulting business (1999 to 2005)
 Tomra Systems AS (Tomra), a recycling company (1991 to 2010)
 Unique AS, Sandnes, a software house (1984 to 1987)
 Tiki Data AS, a PC producer (1983 to 1985)
 Åke Larson Construction AB, Stockholm (1982 to 1992)

Jorgen has also served as a member of various advisory boards and not-for-profit councils, including:
 2019-		The Club of Rome China Chapter, Beijing (Board)
 2015-18	The Club of Rome, Winterthur (ExCom)
 2014-17	AstraZeneca, London (Environmental Sustainability Council)
 2004-08	WWF International, Gland (International Board and Exco)
 2003-07 	Miljøforskningssenteret AS (Board)
 2003-		The Global Footprint Network, San Francisco (Advisory Council)
 2001-08	WWF-Norway, Oslo (Board chair)
 2001-12	British Telecom plc, London (Leadership Panel)
 2000-04	Norwegian Research Council (Committee on Environment and Development)
 2000-06	Fondation du Tour du Valat, Sambuc, France (Board)
 2000-15	The Dow Chemical Company, Midland MI (Corporate Environmental Advisory Council)

Government appointments 
In the year 2005-06 he led the Norwegian Commission on Low Emissions, which "presented a report demonstrating how Norway could reduce her greenhouse gas emissions by ⅔ by 2050". Randers is currently (2008) professor of climate strategy at the BI Norwegian Business School.

He has also undertaken a number of other Government appointments, including:
 2016-17	China Council for International Cooperation in Environment and Development, Beijing (Green Transition Strategy for China to 2050)
 2015-17	Seoul Metropolitan Government (Special advisor to Mayor Park Won Soon)
 2014-16	Shanghai Academy of Social Sciences, Shanghai (Shanghai 2050 Plan)
 2005-06	Norwegian Ministry of Environment (Chair Commission on Reduction of Climate Gases)
 2004-07	Economic Development Board of Rotterdam (International Advisory Board)
 2001-02	Global Reporting Initiative (GRI), Washington (Core Measurement Group)
 1998-02	OECD, Paris (Roundtable on Sustainable Development)
 1985 87	Norwegian Ministry of Social Affairs (Commission on Health Sector Reform)
 1979 83	OECD, Paris (Social effects of forest investment projects)
 1979		United Nations Development Programme (UNDP), Dacca (Planning a Petroleum Institute in Bangladesh)

Publications 
 1972. The Limits to Growth with Donella Meadows and Dennis L. Meadows.
 1980. Elements of the System Dynamics Methods. Edited by Jørgen Randers. MIT Press, Cambridge (Massachusetts), .
 1992. Beyond the Limits with Donella Meadows and Dennis L. Meadows.
 2012. 2052: A Global Forecast for the Next Forty Years. Chelsea Green Publications, White River Junction, Vermont, .

References

External links 
 www.bi.edu
 2052 book supplement website www.2052.info
 BI Norwegian Business School - Jørgen Randers

1945 births
Living people
Norwegian business theorists
Non-fiction environmental writers
Club of Rome members
Ecological economists
People associated with criticism of economic growth
University of Oslo alumni
MIT Sloan School of Management alumni
Academic staff of BI Norwegian Business School
Rectors of BI Norwegian Business School
World Wide Fund for Nature
British Telecom people
Dow Chemical Company employees